The iconic nature of Elvis Presley in music and popular culture has often made him a subject of, or a touchstone in, numerous songs, both in America and throughout the world. A few of Presley's own songs became huge hits in certain regions of the world, in versions whose translation into the required language bore little or no resemblance to the original lyrics. For instance, "Good Rocking tonight", which Presley made famous throughout the world,  became "La voix d'Elvis", a story about how his voice and music inspired a generation of French youngsters to rebel against French colonialism in Algeria. Likewise, "King Creole", the title song to his fourth film (a reference to the name of a nightclub, in the movie), when translated into Spanish by Los Teen Tops, became "Rey del Rock", with lyrics which, irrespective that his name was not actually mentioned, went on to explain, in detail, why Presley was given the title of "King of Rock".

Written in memory of, or explicitly and primarily about Elvis

A–M
 "(619) 239-KING" by Mojo Nixon
 "A Century of Elvis" by Belle and Sebastian
 "Dont Blame it on Elvis" by Lord Mouse and the Kalypso Katz
 "A Liddle Biddy Help from Elvis" Space
 "The All American Boy" by Bobby Bare (as Bill Parsons)
 "Apparition In Las Vegas" Pete Atkin
 "Baby Boom Che" by John Trudell
 "Back to Tupelo" by Mark Knopfler
 "Back 2 the Base" by X
 "Black Velvet" by Alannah Myles
 "Blue Moon Revisited (A Song For Elvis)" by Cowboy Junkies on The Trinity Session
 "Body Electric" by Lana Del Rey
 "Boy From Tupelo" by Emmylou Harris
 "Calling Elvis" by Dire Straits
 "Crazy Little Thing Called Love" by Queen
 "Cry Like Memphis" by Tamara Walker
 "Dead Elvis" by Doug Anthony All Stars
 "Dead Elvis" by Michael Daugherty
 "Dear 53310761" by The Threeteens with Duane Eddy
 "DisGraceland" by Alice Cooper
 "Dreamer's Ball by Queen
 "Ei edes Elvis loistossaan" (Not Even Elvis Even at His Prime) by M. A. Numminen
 "Elviksen kuolema" (Elvis's Death) by Eppu Normaali
 "Elvis" by Pat Green
 "Elvis" by Sister Hazel
 "Elvis Ain't Dead" by Scouting for Girls
 "Elvis and I" by Denis Leary
 "Elvis and Andy" by Confederate Railroad
 "Elvis and His Boss" by The Residents
 "Elvis and Me" by Jimmy Webb
 "Elvis Ate America" by Passengers (side project) (an alias to U2)
 "Elvis Died Today" by Paul and Storm
 "Elvis Died for You" by Zodiac Mindwarp & The Love Reaction
 "Elvis Está Vivo" (Elvis is alive) by Andrés Calamaro
 "Elvis Has Just Left The Building" by Frank Zappa
 "Elvis Has Left the Building" by Jerry Reed
 "Elvis (...I Remember)" by The Screaming Jets
 "Elvis Imitators" by Steve Goodman
 "Elvis in Germany" by Per Gessle
 "Elvis Is Dead" by Living Colour
 "Elvis is Dead" by MxPx
 "Elvis is Dead" by Peter and the Test Tube Babies
 "Elvis is Everywhere" by Mojo Nixon
 "Elvis Lives" by Subway to Sally
 "Elvis, Marilyn and James Dean" by The Bellamy Brothers
 "Elvis on the Radio, Steel Guitar in My Soul" by The KLF
 "Elvis's TV" by Spiders & Snakes
 "Elvis on Velvet" by Stray Cats
 "Elvis Porn" by Lemon Demon
 "Elvis Presley" by Wesley Willis
 "Elvis Presley and America" by U2
 "Elvis Presley Blues" by Gillian Welch
 "Elvis Presley Blues" by Jimmy Buffett
 "Elvis Presley Blvd." by Billy Joel
 "Elvis Stole My Gal" - Vernon Pullins
 "Elvis Was a Narc" by Pinkard and Bowden
 "Elvis Was a Skinhead" by The Ataris
 "Elvis Went to Hollywood" by Counting Crows
 "Elvisly Yours" by The Johnnys
 "Eternal Flame" by The Bangles
 "Ethän vertaa mua Elvikseen" (Please Don't Compare Me to Elvis) by Kari Peitsamon Skootteri
 "Everything Zen" by Bush
 "From Graceland to the Promised Land" by Merle Haggard
 "From Galway to Graceland" by Richard Thompson
 "Going to Graceland" by Dead Milkmen
 "Goodbye Elvis" by Will Tura
 "Goodbye Priscilla (Bye Bye Baby Blue)" by Gene Summers
 "Happy Birthday Elvis" by Loudon Wainwright III
 "Heavenly Child" by Wink Martindale
 "He Ate Too Many Jelly Donuts" by Rick Dees & His Cast Of Idiots
 "He was the King" by Neil Young
"Hellvisback" by Salmo
 "Hey Elvis" by Bryan Adams
 "Hey, Memphis" by LaVern Baker (answer song to "Little Sister")
 "His Kingly Cave" by Frank Black And The Catholics
 "Hound Dog Man" by Roy Orbison
 "House of Cards" by Steve Forbert
 "I Remember Elvis Presley (The King Is Dead)" by Danny Mirror
 "I Remember His First Love Song" by Billy Rebel
 "I Said No" by Gruppo Sportivo
 "I Saw Elvis at Wal-Mart" by Billy Walker
 "I Saw Elvis in a UFO" by Ray Stevens
 "I Saw Mr. Presley Tip-toeing Through The Tulips" by Tiny Tim
 "I Try to Think About Elvis" by Patty Loveless
 "I Want Elvis for Christmas" by Eddie Cochran & the Holly Twins
 "Is The King Still Alive" by Johnny Harra
 "Jesus Mentioned" by Warren Zevon
 "Johnny Bye, Bye" by Bruce Springsteen
 "Just a Touch" by R.E.M. 
 "King Rocker" by Generation X
 "King of the Mountain" by Kate Bush
 "King's Call" by Phil Lynott
 "La voix d'Elvis" by Eddy Mitchell
 "Lights Out" by Lisa Marie Presley
 "Mama's In the Sky With Elvis" by Ray Stevens
 "Me and Elvis" by Human Radio
 "Moon Dog" by Prefab Sprout

N–Z
 "Nobody Knows (I'm Elvis)" by Waylon Jennings
 "Nobody Noticed It" by Lisa Marie Presley
 "Old Friend" by Bill Medley
 "Paint Me On Velvet" by Austin Lounge Lizards
 "Pass Me By" by Insane Clown Posse
 "Personal Jesus" by Depeche Mode
 "Porcelain Monkey" by Warren Zevon
 "Porch Swing in Tupelo" by Elton John
 "Private Presley" by Peach Pit
 "Real Good Looking Boy" by The Who
 "Reminisce Cafe" by Gene Summers
 "Rockin' With Elvis" by Jimmy Velvit
 "Round Here" by Counting Crows
 "Singing with Angels" by Suzi Quatro
 "Some Kind of Energy" by Fabio Mendonca
 "Still" by Linda Ann McConnell
 "That's Why" by John Gorka
 "That Ain't Elvis Playing Piano" by Eighteen Visions
 "The All American Boy" by Bill Parsons
 "The Elvis Letter" by Wayne Newton
 "The Day Elvis Died" by Boxcar Willie
 "The King & Eye" by The Residents
 "The King and I" by Eminem featuring CeeLo Green
 "The King Is Gone" by Ronnie McDowell
 "The King Is Gone (So Are You)" by George Jones
 "The King Knows How" by Over The Rhine
 "The King of Rock and Roll" by Dio
 "The King Of Rock 'N' Roll" by Prefab Sprout
 "The Only King" by The Everybodyfields
 "The Whole World Misses You (We Miss You Elvis)" by Carl Perkins
 "This Ain't Vegas and You Ain't Elvis" by Spitfire
 "Tupelo" by Nick Cave and the Bad Seeds
 "Tupelo Mississippi Flash" by Jerry Reed
 "Velvet Elvis" by Weird Al Yankovic
 "Walking in Memphis" by Marc Cohn, later covered by Cher.
 "Weed that Killed Elvis" by Levellers
 "Went to See the Gypsy" by Bob Dylan
 "We Remember The King" by Johnny Cash featuring Carl Perkins, Roy Orbison and Jerry Lee Lewis
 "Where's Elvis?" by M-Phazes and Drapht
 "Who Is Elvis" by Interactive
 "Young Elvis" by Jayda

Substantial reference
 "Advertising Space" by Robbie Williams
 "American Pie" by Don McLean
 "Big Train from Memphis" by John Fogerty
 "Bigger Than the Beatles" by Joe Diffie
 "Braille" by Regina Spektor
 "Calling Elvis" by Dire Straits
 "Carl Perkin's Cadillac" by Drive-By Truckers
 "Elvis and Marilyn" by Marty Balin
 "Elvis Bought Dora a Cadillac" by Wall of Voodoo
 "Hey Hey, My My (Into the Black)" by Neil Young
 "John and Elvis Are Dead" by George Michael
 "The King Is Dead" by Margo Price, about him, Lennon and MLK Jr
 "There's A Guy Works Down The Chip Shop Swears He's Elvis" by Kirsty MacColl (also recorded as Killen ner' på Konsum svär att han är Elvis by Elisabeth Andreassen)
 "Wendy Under the Stars", by The Odds
 "Walking in Memphis" by Marc Cohn

Nominal reference
 "All I Want To Do" by Sugarland
 "All My Friends Say" by Luke Bryan
 "Angel" by Eurythmics
 "Berlin to Memphis" by Elvis Hitler
 "Chocolate Cake" by Crowded House
 "Disco Duck" by Rick Dees & His Cast Of Idiots
 “Dirty Bombs” by Grayscale
 "Everybody's Making it Big but Me" by Dr Hook
 "Face Down" by Prince
 "Fight the Power" by Public Enemy
 "Finite=Alright" by David Byrne
 "FM (No Static at All)" by Steely Dan
 "Free Fallin'" by Tom Petty
 "Ghost Town" by Adam Lambert
 "God" by John Lennon
 "Graceland" by Paul Simon
 "Graceland Too" by Phoebe Bridgers
 "High Lonesome" by The Gaslight Anthem
 "Into You" by Ariana Grande
 "I Still Believe" by Frank Turner
 "If Dirt Were Dollars" by Don Henley
  "Jesse", by Scott Walker of The Walker Brothers, about Elvis' stillborn twin
 "Keep On Rockin' by Sammy Hagar
 "Last Name" by Carrie Underwood
 "Little Man" by Alan Jackson
 "Look At Me, I'm Sandra Dee", from the Grease soundtrack. In the original stage version, the song references Sal Mineo. However, Mineo was stabbed to death a year before the motion picture version began filming, so the line was changed to refer to Elvis Presley instead. Coincidentally, the scene was filmed on August 16, 1977, the date of Elvis Presley's death.
 "Man on the Moon" by R.E.M.
 "Megalomaniac" by Incubus
 "Million Dollar Man" by Lana Del Rey
 "Mmm Skyscraper I Love You" by Underworld
 "Moonlight" by Ariana Grande
"Mother of Muses" by Bob Dylan
 "Nobody Knows" by Paul Brady
 "La Petite Robe Noir" by The Nits
 “Red Velvet” by Bladee and Yung Lean
 "Rock and Roll Christmas" by George Thorogood and the Destroyers
 "Rock 'n' Roll Kids" by Paul Harrington and Charlie McGettigan
 "Rock Star" by Nickelback
 "Teenage Wedding" by Johnny Angel
 "Tele-vee-shun" by Stan Freberg
 "That Don't Impress Me Much" by Shania Twain
 "Uncast Shadow of a Southern Myth" by Parquet Courts
 "Up Your Speed" by Sway DaSafo
 "Vade Mecum Gunslinger" by The Blue Aeroplanes
 “Waking Up in Vegas” by Katy Perry
 "When" by Shania Twain
 "We Didn't Start the Fire" by Billy Joel
 "White December" by Kylie Minogue
 "White Privilege II" by Macklemore & Ryan Lewis featuring Jamila Woods
 "Who's Gonna Fill Their Shoes" by George Jones
 "Working Class Man" by Jimmy Barnes
 "Without Me" by Eminem

References

External links
 List of 215 songs that mention Elvis Presley

 Songs
Elvis Presley